Konstantin Nikolayevich Sineokov (born 30 May 1978) is a Russian professional football coach and a former player.

Club career
He made his Russian Football National League debut for FC Dynamo Stavropol on 26 September 1997 in a game against FC Torpedo Volzhsky. He played 5 seasons in the FNL.

External links
 

1978 births
Living people
Russian footballers
Association football defenders
FC Dynamo Stavropol players
FC Akhmat Grozny players
PFC Spartak Nalchik players
FC Rotor Volgograd players
FC Nizhny Novgorod (2007) players
FC Neftekhimik Nizhnekamsk players
Russian football managers
FC Mashuk-KMV Pyatigorsk players
FC Spartak-MZhK Ryazan players
Sportspeople from Stavropol Krai